The KXTV/KOVR Tower (also known as the Sacramento Joint Venture Tower) is a  guyed communication tower in Walnut Grove, California, United States.

Built in 2000, it is the tallest structure in California, the third-tallest guyed mast in the world (as of 2001), and the seventh tallest structure to have ever existed if the destroyed Warsaw radio mast, the Burj Khalifa in Dubai, the Shanghai Tower in Shanghai and the Tokyo Sky Tree in Tokyo are included.

Omni-directional TV transmitting antennas on the tower carry the over-the-air (OTA) broadcast signals for KXTV-TV channel 10 (virtual and transmit) and KOVR-TV channel 13 (virtual) and 25 (transmit).

In the neighborhood of KXTV/KOVR Tower are two towers of similar height, the Channel 40 and KVIE-TV Channel 6 Tower and the Channel 3-Hearst-Argyle Tower, forming an impressive antenna "farm" on the east side of the Sacramento River and west of the Interstate 5 freeway, which can be easily seen for miles around in every direction.

The antennas on these towers serve broadcast stations airing programming to TV viewers in the Sacramento/Stockton/Modesto DMA (Designated Market Area) in California's Central Valley.

With their significant height and central location in Walnut Grove, they provide line-of-sight (LOS) signal coverage to the adjacent flat valley terrain for over 60 miles (100 km) to the north (Sacramento) and to the south-southeast (Stockton and Modesto). The towers also provide quite good coverage across the valley to the east into the Sierra Nevada foothills and mountains, and to the west to portions of the eastern San Francisco Bay Area (eastern Solano and Contra Costa counties).

The movie Fall was based on this radio tower according to the director.

Current tenants

KOVR Ch. 13 (analog (former))
KOVR Ch. 25 (digital)
KMAX Ch. 21 (digital)
KXTV Ch. 10 (analog (former))
KXTV Ch. 10 (digital)
KTFK Ch. 26 (digital)
BENL Ch. 23 (digital)

See also
List of masts
Table of masts
List of towers
World's tallest structures
List of tallest structures in the United States

References

External links
 
 
 KXTV/KOVR Tower at skyscraperpage.com
 USGS aerial image
 Fybush.com Tower Site of the Week November 11, 2005

Buildings and structures in Sacramento County, California
Radio masts and towers in the United States
Towers completed in 1986
Towers in California
1986 establishments in California